State Route 184 (SR 184) is a  state highway that runs south-to-north through portions of Banks and Stephens counties in the northeastern part of the U.S. state of Georgia. The route's southern terminus is at SR 63 in northeastern Banks County. The northern terminus at the Tugaloo River and the South Carolina state line where the road continues as Cleveland Pike Road.

Route description
SR 184 begins at an intersection with SR 63 in the northeastern section of Banks County. It travels northwest on Martins Bridge Road briefly until turning right onto Damascus Road. To the north-northeast, the route enters the extreme northwest corner of Franklin County and reaches the meeting point of Banks, Franklin, and Stephens counties. It intersects the southern terminus of SR 105, and then runs along the Franklin–Stephens county line and forms the southern border of the Chattahoochee National Forest.

SR 184, now wholly inside the boundaries of the Chattahoochee National Forest and carrying the name Homer Road, travels north towards the community of Boydville, passing Currahee Mountain at extremely close range. It subsequently makes a right turn at Dicks Hill Parkway and intersects US 123/SR 17/SR 365. US 123/SR 365 begin a concurrency with SR 184, which now bears the name Currahee Street, and travel north into Toccoa, while SR 17 continues to the east. Between Boydville and Toccoa city limits, the road is again the boundary line for the Chattahoochee Forest. In downtown Toccoa, SR 184 leaves the concurrency at the intersection of Currahee Street and Broad Street by turning north onto Broad Street while the other two routes stay on Currahee Street. This intersection is also the northern terminus of SR 63/SR 106, which head south on Broad Street. After passing under the Norfolk Southern Railway underpass, SR 184 turns right onto Tugalo Street forming a wrong-way concurrency with SR 17 Alternate.

As SR 184 leaves Toccoa's city limits, it is again in the Chattahoochee Forest as it travels northeast towards the Tugaloo River. The road crosses into South Carolina on a bridge over the river. Here, the Georgia state route ends and Cleveland Pike Road continues into Oconee County as a state secondary route.

Major intersections

See also

References

External links

 Georgia Roads (Routes 181 - 200)

184
Transportation in Banks County, Georgia
Transportation in Franklin County, Georgia
Transportation in Stephens County, Georgia